Miss Alabama USA, previously known as Miss Alabama Universe, is the beauty pageant that selects the representative for the state of Alabama in the Miss USA pageant, and the name of the title held by its winner. The pageant is directed by RPM Productions.

Alabama's most successful placement was in 1967, when Sylvia Hitchcock was crowned Miss USA. She later went on to be crowned Miss Universe 1967 as well. Alabama's most recent placement was in 2020, when Kelly Hutchinson placed as the fourth runner-up.

The current Miss Alabama USA is Sophie Burzynski of Auburn, Alabama, who was crowned on January 28, 2022 at Jay & Susie Gogue Performing Arts Center in Auburn. Burzynski will represent Alabama at Miss USA 2023.

Gallery of titleholders

Results summary

Placements in Miss USA
Miss USA: Sylvia Hitchcock (Miss Universe 1967)
1st Runners-Up: Pamela Flowers (1975), Candace Michelle Brown (1992), Michelle Arnette (2003), Mary-Margaret McCord (2013)
2nd Runners-Up: Doris Edwards (1953), Judith Carlson (1958), Margaret Gordon (1960), Jina Mitchell (2000), Madeline Mitchell (2011)
3rd Runner-Up: Pamela Rigas (1980)
4th Runner-Up: Suellen Robinson (1961), Kelly Hutchinson (2020)
Top 5: Peyton Brown  (2016)
Top 10/11/12: JoAnne Henderson (1981), Candy Carley (1991), Autumn Smith (1997), Tara Tucker (2002), Tara Darby (2004), Haleigh Stidham (2006), Audrey Moore (2010), Katherine Webb (2012), Madison Guthrie (2015)
Top 15/20: Pat Sullivan (1959), Dinah Irene Armstrong (1963), Pamela Jean Borgfeldt (1964), Leigh Sanford  (1965), Claudia Robinson (1968), Hitsy Parnell (1969), Jesica Ahlberg (2014)

Alabama has a record of 30 placements at Miss USA.

Awards
Miss Congeniality: Peyton Brown (2016)
Miss Photogenic: Pamela Flowers (1975), Rebecca Moore (2007), Audrey Moore (2010)

Winners

Color key

Notes

References

External links
Official website

Alabama
Alabama culture
Women in Alabama
1952 establishments in Alabama
Recurring events established in 1952
Annual events in Alabama